Henri Leconte and Tomáš Šmíd were the defending champions, but did not participate this year.

Guy Forget and Andrés Gómez won the title, defeating Mike De Palmer and Gary Donnelly 6–3, 6–4 in the final.

Seeds

  Joakim Nyström /  Mats Wilander (quarterfinals)
  Stefan Edberg /  Anders Järryd (semifinals)
  Heinz Günthardt /  Balázs Taróczy (first round)
 N/A

Draw

Draw

References
Draw

Stockholm Open
1985 Grand Prix (tennis)